Anthony Craig James is an English former footballer. He played as a centre back for Gainsborough Trinity, Lincoln City, Leicester City, Hereford United and Plymouth Argyle.

He is best remembered at Leicester as being the player who scored the goal that kept Leicester from dropping into the 3rd tier of English football for the first time, after his 24th minute close range conversion from a corner saw Leicester beat Oxford United 1–0 to climb out of the relegation on the final day of the 1990-91 season, which ultimately saw the start of the club's upturn in form in the 1990s. He was also awarded the club's Player of the Year award in the same season. However a broken leg in a game against Wolverhampton Wanderers in October 1991 and several injuries afterwards halted his progression and he never really claimed an extended run in the Leicester side after that.

References

External links
 Career statistics

English footballers
English Football League players
Gainsborough Trinity F.C. players
Lincoln City F.C. players
Leicester City F.C. players
Hereford United F.C. players
Plymouth Argyle F.C. players
1967 births
Living people
Association football defenders
Footballers from Sheffield